Toro Muerto is a collection of ancient petroglyphs in the Peruvian coastal desert, found in the Castilla province in the region Arequipa in Peru. The site contains some 3000 volcanic rocks with petroglyphs dating back to the Wari culture, active from 500 to 1000 CE. The Wari were a Middle Horizon civilization that flourished in the south-central Andes and coastal area of modern-day Peru.

References

Archaeological sites in Peru
Rock art in South America
Archaeological sites in Arequipa Region
Wari culture